Tsjaka is a settlement in the Omaheke Region in eastern Namibia. The village can only be reached by a gravel road via the Highway C22. 

Tsjaka belongs to the Kalahari Constituency of Omaheke Region. The settlement features a centre of the Komeho Development Agency, a non-governmental organisation that also provides accommodation facilities for visitors, several farms in the radius of 50 kilometres and a primary school. The Mphe Thuto Primary School serves 440 learners from the settlement and the neighbouring farms and location. The main economic activity is subsistence farming with goats and sheep.

References

Populated places in the Omaheke Region